Shishiga is also an informal name for 2-tonne army truck GAZ-66

It is described as, white, nude, and tousled and is considered to harass the people and bring misfortune to the drunkards.

The same creature is important in the mythology of Komi people. She supposedly lives in the Kama River and often goes to the shore to comb her hair. Everybody who sees her will soon drown or die by another cause.

External links
Komi Shishiga 

Russian mythology
Slavic legendary creatures
Female legendary creatures
Slavic household deities